The 736th Bombardment Squadron is an inactive United States Air Force unit.  It was last assigned to the 454th Bombardment Wing at Columbus Air Force Base, Mississippi, where it was inactivated on 2 July 1969 as the United States reduced its inventory of older Boeing B-52 Stratofortresses..

The squadron was first activated in June 1943.  After training in the United States with the Consolidated B-24 Liberator, the squadron deployed to the Mediterranean Theater of Operations, participating in the strategic bombing campaign against Germany.   It earned two Distinguished Unit Citations for its combat operations.  Following V-E Day, the squadron returned to the United States for conversion as a very heavy bomber unit, but was inactivated instead.

The squadron was activated in the reserves in 1947, but does not appear to have been fully staffed or equipped.  In 1949, it moved to Fairchild Air Force Base, Washington, where it became a corollary of the active duty unit there.  It was mobilized for the Korean War in May 1951, but its personnel were used as fillers for other units and it was inactivated.  It was redesignated the 736th Troop Carrier Squadron and again activated in the reserve in 1952, but was inactivated the following year and its personnel and equipment transferred to another unit.

In 1963, the squadron returned to the heavy bomber mission and was activated at Columbus as part of a Strategic Air Command program to continue the histories of World War II combat units.

History

World War II
The squadron was first organized at Alamogordo Army Air Field, New Mexico on 1 June 1943 as one of the four squadrons of the 454th Bombardment Group.  It trained with Consolidated B-24 Liberator bombers.  After completing training, it left for the Mediterranean Theater of Operations on 8 December 1943.

The squadron arrived in Italy in January 1944, settling in at its combat station, San Giovanni Airfield, by the end of the month. Its primary focus was on long range bombing missions against industrial targets such as enemy oil refineries and munitions and aircraft factories.  It struck transportation targets including harbors and airfields in Italy, France, Germany, Austria, Czechoslovakia, Hungary, Yugoslavia, Greece and Rumania  The squadron received a Distinguished Unit Citation (DUC) for a raid on an airfield at Bad Vöslau, Austria on 12 April 1944. The squadron earned a second DUC during an attack on a steel plant at Linz, Austria, as the 454th Group led its wing through determined opposition.

The squadron also flew air support and air interdiction missions against marshalling yards, troop concentrations and rail lines for Operation Strangle, the effort to cut German supply lines in Italy north of Rome between March and May 1944.  The squadron participated in the drive to Rome; Operation Dragoon, the invasion of southern France; and Operation Grapeshot, the Spring 1945 offensive in Northern Italy.

The squadron left Italy in July 1945 and reformed at Sioux Falls Army Air Field, South Dakota the following month.  It was redesignated as a very heavy bombardment squadron in anticipation of training and redeployment to the Pacific, but with the Japanese surrender, it was inactivated in October.

Air Force reserve

The squadron was reactivated in April 1947 at McChord Field, Washington as a reserve unit.  It trained under the supervision of Air Defense Command's 406th AAF Base Unit (later 2345th Air Force Reserve Training Center).  The squadron was nominally a heavy bomber unit, but it is not clear whether it had any combat aircraft assigned.  In 1948 Continental Air Command (ConAC) assumed responsibility for managing reserve and Air National Guard units from ADC.

The May 1949 Air Force Reserve program called for a new type of unit, the Corollary unit, which was a reserve unit integrated with an active duty unit.  The plan was viewed as the best method to train reservists by mixing them with an existing regular unit to perform duties alongside the regular unit.   The squadron moved to Spokane Air Force Base, Washington, where it operated the Boeing B-29 Superfortresses of the regular 92d Bombardment Wing located there.  All reserve corollary units were mobilized for the Korean War.   As the 92d Wing was beginning to convert to the Convair B-36 Peacemaker, the squadron was  called to active duty, its personnel were used as fillers for other organizations, and it was inactivated on 16 June 1951.

The reserve mobilization for the Korean War had left the reserve without aircraft, and the reserves did not receive aircraft again until July 1952.   In preparing for the receipt of aircraft, in June 1952, ConAC activated the 454th Troop Carrier Wing at Portland International Airport, Oregon to replace the 922d Reserve Training Wing, the non-flying headquarters for reserve units there.  The squadron was redesignated the 736th Troop Carrier Squadron and activated with the 454th Wing.  It began training with Curtiss C-46 Commando transports.  However, on 1 January 1953, the 403d Troop Carrier Wing, a reserve unit that had served with Far East Air Forces in Japan and Korea, was relieved from active duty and replaced the 454th Wing at Portland.  As a result, the 736th inactivated and transferred it personnel and equipment to the 63d Troop Carrier Squadron, which was activated in its place.

Strategic Air Command
In February 1963, Strategic Air Command (SAC) organized the 454th Bombardment Wing at Columbus Air Force Base, Mississippi, where it assumed the aircraft, personnel and equipment of the discontinued 4228th Strategic Wing. The 4228th was a Major Command controlled (MAJCON) wing, which could not carry a permanent history or lineage, and SAC wanted to replace it with a permanent unit.  As part of this reorganization, the 736th was again designated the 736th Bombardment Squadron, was organized, and assumed the mission, personnel and equipment of the 492d Bombardment Squadron, which was simultaneously inactivated.

One half of the squadron's Boeing B-52F Stratofortresses were maintained on fifteen minute alert, fully fueled and ready for combat to reduce vulnerability to a Soviet missile strike.  In addition, the squadron trained for strategic bombardment missions.  The squadron was one of the first to deploy its planes and aircrews to support Operation Arc Light, SAC operations in Southeast Asia, starting its first deployment on 16 November 1965.  This deployment lasted until 31 March 1966, and the squadron again deployed its personnel and planes to Anderson Air Force Base, Guam from 27 June to about 23 December 1967 and between 28 June and 28 December 1968.

However, shortly after the squadron's first deployment to support Arc Light, Robert S. McNamara, Secretary of Defense approved a phaseout program that would reduce SAC's bomber force. The program called for the mid-1971 retirement of B-52Cs, and of several subsequent B-52 models.  Only a few months after its return from its third deployment, in May 1969, the 454th Wing began focusing on phasing down its operations and transferring Columbus to Air Training Command.  The squadron was inactivated on 2 July 1969 with the end of SAC operations at Columbus.

Lineage
 Constituted as the 736th Bombardment Squadron (Heavy) on 14 May 1943
 Activated on 1 June 1943
 Redesignated 736th Bombardment Squadron, Heavy c. 1944
 Redesignated 736th Bombardment Squadron, Very Heavy on 5 August 1945
 Inactivated on 17 October 1945
 Activated in the reserve on 27 April 1947
 Redesignated 736th Bombardment Squadron, Medium on 27 June 1949
 Ordered to active service on 1 May 1951
 Inactivated on 16 June 1951
 Redesignated 736th Troop Carrier Squadron, Medium on 26 May 1952
 Activated in the reserve on 13 June 1952
 Inactivated on 1 January 1953
 Redesignated 736th Bombardment Squadron, Heavy and activated, on 15 Nov 1962 (not organized)
 Organized on 1 February 1963
 Inactivated on 2 July 1969

Assignments
 454th Bombardment Group, 1 June 1943 – 17 October 1945
 454th Bombardment Group, 27 April 1947 – 16 Jun 1951
 454th Troop Carrier Group, 13 June 1952 – 1 January 1953
 Strategic Air Command, 15 November 1962 (not organized)
 454th Bombardment Wing, 1 February 1963 – 2 July 1969

Stations
 Alamogordo Army Air Field, New Mexico, 1 June 1943
 Davis-Monthan Field, Arizona, 1 July 1943
 McCook Army Air Field, Nebraska, 30 July 1943
 Charleston Army Air Field, South Carolina, 3 October–8 December 1943
 Torretto Airfield, Italy, 16 January 1944
 San Giovanni Airfield, Italy, 24 January 1944 – July 1945
 Sioux Falls Army Air Field, South Dakota, 1 August 1945
 Pyote Army Air Field, Texas, 17 August–17 October 1945
 McChord Field (later McChord Air Force Base), Washington, 27 April 1947
 Spokane Air Force Base (later Fairchild Air Force Base), Washington, 27 June 1949 – 16 June 1951
 Portland International Airport, Oregon, 13 June 1952 – 1 January 1953
 Columbus Air Force Base, Mississippi, 1 February 1963 – 2 July 1969

Aircraft
 Consolidated B-24 Liberator, 1943-1945
 Boeing B-29 Superfortress, 1949-1951
 Curtiss C-46 Commando, 1952-1953
 Boeing B-52 Stratofortress, 1963-1968

Awards and campaigns

See also
 List of B-52 Units of the United States Air Force
 B-24 Liberator units of the United States Army Air Forces

References

Notes
 Explanatory notes

 Citations

Bibliography

 
 
 
 
 
 
 
 

Bombardment squadrons of the United States Air Force
Bombardment squadrons of the United States Army Air Forces
Military units and formations established in 1943
World War II strategic bombing units
Military units and formations of the United States Air Force Reserves